Nikos Troiris (born 2 December 1986) is a Greek footballer currently playing for Football League 2 side Panelefsiniakos. He previously played in the Greek Superleague for Asteras Tripolis.

References

1986 births
Living people
Greek footballers
Iraklis Thessaloniki F.C. players
Association football midfielders
Panelefsiniakos F.C. players
Footballers from Central Macedonia
People from Pieria (regional unit)